Kunst og Kultur (meaning Art and Culture in English) is a Norwegian art historical journal founded in 1910 by Harry Fett and Haakon Shetelig. Leif Østby edited the journal from 1962 to 1980. Editor from 2018 is Bente Aass Solbakken. The magazine has its headquarters in Oslo.

See also
 Open access in Norway

References

External links
 WorldCat record
 

1910 establishments in Norway
Cultural magazines
Magazines established in 1910
Magazines published in Oslo
Norwegian-language magazines
Universitetsforlaget academic journals